Medusa is a steel roller coaster located at Six Flags Discovery Kingdom in Vallejo, California. Built by Bolliger & Mabillard, Medusa opened in 2000 as the first floorless roller coaster on the West Coast. The roller coaster features seven inversions, a -tall lift hill with a  drop, and the first Sea serpent roll element ever built on a B&M roller coaster.

History
On November 10, 1999, Six Flags Discovery Kingdom (then Six Flags Marine World) announced that Medusa would be added to the park. It would be a custom floorless coaster built by Bolliger & Mabillard. The ride officially opened on March 18, 2000. It was built over the park's original parking lot, directly in front of the park.

Ride experience
The ride starts with a large left-hand turnaround out of the station and onto the lift hill. At the top is a B&M pre-drop followed by a right turn. After that is the large  drop which achieves the same height as the lift hill despite the B&M Pre-Drop by dipping below ground level into a pit. The drop is followed by a  vertical loop. Medusa then features a dive loop to the left and a zero-G roll. The ride then enters a Sea-Serpent roll.  After a very quick breather during the mid-course brakes, the train whips into a twisting left-hand drop into a flatspin under the brake run. The on-ride photo is taken directly after the first flatspin. The ride then travels through an inclined helix to the left before diving into the second flatspin. The ride's finale is a quick 85 degree banked helix to the right before a quick S-Turn, which creates the sensation that the train will run into one of the lift supports. Then, the ride will either glide into the brake run and travel back toward the station, or may come to a sudden stop if it is operating with three trains and another train is already in the station.

See also
 Medusa (Six Flags Great Adventure), a floorless roller coaster at Six Flags Great Adventure formerly known as Bizzaro

References

Roller coasters introduced in 2000
Roller coasters in California
Six Flags Discovery Kingdom
Roller coasters operated by Six Flags
Floorless Coaster roller coasters manufactured by Bolliger & Mabillard